The Hanlon Expressway or Hanlon Parkway is a high-capacity at-grade suburban limited-access road connecting Highway 401 with the city of Guelph in the Canadian province of Ontario. The  route travels in a generally north-south direction on the city's west side. It is signed as Highway 6 for its entire length; from Wellington Street to Woodlawn Road it is concurrent with Highway 7. The speed limit alternates between 70 and 80 km/h (45 and 50 mph).

The road was originally designed to be a freeway, but budget limitations precluded the construction of overpasses; apart from the interchanges with Highway 401, Laird Road, and Wellington Street West (Highway 7 and former Highway 24), all junctions are at-grade intersections. There are also two railway crossings near the northern terminus, though both are for spur lines. The Hanlon is graded and landscaped similarly to a freeway, with broad flat shoulders and an open median.

It was initially built between 1972 and 1975, after years of planning and engineering. The first interchange, at Wellington Street, was opened 25 years later in 2001. In late 2013, a second interchange was completed at Laird Road. The Government of Ontario has announced plans to build a new Highway 7 freeway bypass joining the current northern terminus of the Hanlon Expressway to the Conestoga Parkway in Kitchener; in-line with this work, the Hanlon Expressway will be upgraded to 400-series standards. Long-term plans call for a potential extension south of Highway 401 to meet Highway 6 south of Freelton.

Route description 

The Hanlon Expressway begins at a trumpet interchange with Highway 401 and cuts through several farms northward before curving slightly westward to follow along the west side of the right-of-way of Hanlon Road. It enters Guelph at Maltby Road, skirting the outskirts of urban development. At the Laird Road interchange, opened in late 2013, the expressway encounters the Hanlon Creek Business Park.
As it progresses into residential subdivisions, the Hanlon Expressway encounters an at-grade intersection, with Downey Road travelling to the west and Kortright Road West to the east. Continuing north, the route crosses to the east side of the Hanlon Road right-of-way as it intersects Stone Road West to the west of the Stone Road Mall. Before crossing the Speed River, the expressway meets College Avenue West, an at-grade intersection at the southwest corner of Centennial Park Arena.

The Hanlon Expressway crosses the Speed River as it swerves to the west and meets Wellington Street, the only other interchange along the route. To the east, Wellington Road is Highway 7, which follows the Hanlon Expressway north from the interchange; to the west it was formerly Highway 24. North of the Wellington Road the expressway was built slightly west of what is now Silvercreek Parkway. It passes beneath the a line of the Goderich–Exeter Railway, a sideline of the Canadian Pacific Railway, before encountering three at-grade intersections: Paisley Road, Willow Road and Speedvale Avenue West. This section also features two at-grade rail crossings. Shortly thereafter, it ends at Woodlawn Road West; Highway 6 travels east from this point while Highway 7 travels west.

The road, like with nearby Hanlon Creek, is named after Felix Hanlon, one of the men who cut the first tree in Guelph along with John Galt. He was one of the original settlers in the area, and his family eventually deeded their land to the city.

History 
Prior to the construction of the Hanlon Expressway, Hanlon Road existed as far north as College Avenue. Edinburgh Road was the westernmost crossing of the Speed River. On the opposite side of the valley, Silvercreek Road continued, as it does today, along the same right-of-way as Hanlon Road.
With the rapid suburban expansion of Guelph in the 1950s and 1960s, a revised transportation plan was conceived to handle the increasing traffic load. The Guelph Area Transportation Study was completed in 1967, and recommended a new controlled-access highway to allow through-traffic on Highway 6 to bypass the city. Route planning, engineering and design began on October 2, 1967 and was subsequently completed in 1969.
Construction began between Waterloo Avenue and Stone Road in 1970;
this section opened on June 28, 1972. The next section, from Stone Road to Clair Road, opened in October 1973. Work on the northern section from Waterloo Avenue to Woodlawn Road began in August 1974.
That section, as well as the final section south to Highway 401 were opened on November 7, 1975.

Initially, the Hanlon featured no interchanges.
Despite this, this Ministry of Transportation of Ontario (MTO) has planned to upgrade the route to a freeway since at least 1994, when an environmental assessment (EA) for the expressway north of the Speed River was completed.
Construction of the Wellington Avenue interchange began in October 1998;
it opened in July 2001, connecting Wellington Street west of the expressway with the Silvercreek Parkway into downtown Guelph. The interchange cost C$13.2 million and opened a year later than expected due to a design flaw that resulted in several months of delay and a lawsuit against the MTO resulting in a budget overrun of C$3.2 million. No further work has been done north of the Speed River, and the 1994 EA now requires updating.
On April 30, 2012, construction began on the Laird Road interchange. It partially opened on the week of November 11, 2013,
and was fully opened on November 29, 2013, in a public ceremony attended by local officials as well as Guelph MPP Liz Sandals.

Future 
As initially envisioned, the Hanlon Expressway will be upgraded to a controlled-access highway by removing all existing at-grade intersections and improving the highway to 400-series standards. Planning for this work initially began in the early 1990s with the EA for the section north of the Speed River, which resulted in the construction of the Wellington Street interchange. The EA for the section south of the Speed River began in early 2007. The Laird Road interchange and associated closing of the Clair Road intersection were the first projects completed as part of this work.

Future projects will result in numerous changes. A full interchange will be constructed between Wellington County Road 34 and Maltby Road; the intersection with the former will become an overpass while the latter will be closed, with Maltby Road terminating at a cul-de-sac on both sides of the expressway. Further north, a partial-access diamond interchange will be built at Downey Road / Kortright Road West, with ramps from the northbound lanes and to the southbound lanes and the crossroad run beneath the expressway.
The lack of ramps on the north side is due to the proximity of Stone Road to the north, where a full interchange will be constructed. A service road will be constructed along the west side of the expressway connecting Downey Road and Stone Road to provide better access to the YMCA,
which previous controversial plans had neglected. At College Road, an underpass will be built.

Major intersections

References 

Ontario provincial highways
Transport in Guelph
Roads in Wellington County, Ontario
Expressways in Canada